During the 2006–07 Spanish football season, Valencia CF competed in La Liga, the Copa del Rey and the UEFA Champions League.

Overview
Valencia made significant changes for the season, with coach Quique Sánchez Flores and technical director Amedeo Carboni overhauling the squad. Players who did not fit in the current playing system, such as Marco Di Vaio, Bernardo Corradi, Pablo Aimar, Rufete, and Mista, were some of those who were sold, while Fábio Aurélio signed for Liverpool (reuniting with former Valencia manager Rafael Benítez) after refusing an extension to his contract. To strengthen the squad, Valencia signed Joaquin, Asier del Horno, Fernando Morientes and Francesco Tavano, as well as recalling David Silva and Jaime Gavilán from loan spells, and promoting several youngsters from the Valencia B squad. The club's transfer activity was not wholly successful, however: the club failed in an attempt to sign Benfica winger Simão, while veteran defender Roberto Ayala expressed his desire to sign for rivals Villarreal.

Valencia started the season strongly, winning their first three Champions League matches, against Olympiacos, Roma and Shakhtar Donetsk. The team qualified to pass on to the next round in a 2–2 draw against Shaktar on Matchday Four. On 15 December, Valencia were drawn to play against Italian champions Inter Milan in the last 16 of the Champions League, with the first leg scheduled to take place on 21 February. In La Liga, Valencia started the season with victories against Real Betis, Atlético Madrid, Getafe and Gimnàstic de Tarragona, along with a creditable draw with reigning Liga champions Barcelona. As of 1 October, Valencia were second, behind Barcelona on goal difference. However, they went through a slump in November which caused them to slip up in the league. The first of six winless matches started with a 1–0 defeat to Racing de Santander. This poor run was attributed to injuries to key players like captain David Albelda, midfielder Rubén Baraja, wingers Jaime Gavilán and Vicente, defenders Carlos Marchena and Asier del Horno and forward Francesco Tavano. Despite all these worries, the team is made a strong comeback, winning their last three matches before the winter break (against Deportivo de La Coruña, Real Zaragoza and Mallorca).

Squad
Squad at end of season

Left club during season

Transfers

In
  Fernando Morientes –  Liverpool
  David Silva –  Celta Vigo, loan return
  Jaime Gavilán –  Getafe, loan return
  Stefano Fiore –  Fiorentina, loan return
  Javier Garrido Ramírez –  Albacete, loan return
  Asier del Horno –  Chelsea
  Francesco Tavano –  Empoli
  Joaquín –  Real Betis

Out
  Marco Di Vaio –  Monaco
  Amedeo Carboni – retired
  Fábio Aurélio –  Liverpool
  José Enrique –  Villarreal
  Fabián Estoyanoff –  Deportivo, loan
  Marco Caneira –  Sporting CP, loan
  Bernardo Corradi –  Manchester City
  Francisco Rufete –  Espanyol
  Mista –  Atlético Madrid
  Pablo Aimar –  Real Zaragoza
  Javier Garrido Ramírez –  Lorca Deportiva
  Patrick Kluivert –  PSV
  Stefano Fiore –  Torino

Results

La Liga

References 

Valencia CF seasons
Valencia